The East Tennessee & Western North Carolina Railroad , affectionately called the "Tweetsie" as a verbal acronym of its initials (ET&WNC) but also in reference to the sound of its steam whistles, was a primarily  narrow gauge railroad established in 1866 for the purpose of serving the mines at Cranberry, North Carolina.

The  narrow gauge portion of the ET&WNC was abandoned in 1950. The   segment of the line from Johnson City to Elizabethton, Tennessee, operated as East Tennessee Railway until 2003. In 2012 the rails and ties were removed to make way for a rail-trail. This trail was named the Tweetsie Trail.

History
The East Tennessee & Western North Carolina Transportation Company was chartered by the Tennessee General Assembly on May 24, 1866. Lack of financial backing led to the venture's failure, and the railroad was abandoned in 1874. The Cranberry Iron Company acquired the line between 1876 and 1879, and designated the railroad one of its subsidiaries. The initial  segment through the Appalachian Mountains from Johnson City to Hampton, Tennessee via Elizabethton was completed on August 22, 1881, by Pennsylvania-based financier Ario Pardee, and the technical expertise of Thomas Matson (the noted railway engineer); a line extension to Cranberry opened on July 3, 1882.  Soon dubbed by mountain residents as the "Railway with a Heart" as railroad personnel often performed errands for the locals (and even allowed passengers to ride for free during the Great Depression), its tickets were even validated with a heart-shaped punch.

The ET&WNC had five Baldwin Locomotive Works  Ten Wheelers: #9 (1911), #10 (1916), #11 (1916), #12 (1917), and #14 (1919). All the engines were painted black, but Clarence Hobbs chose to paint the engines green to resemble the Southern Railway standard gauge engines. In the midst of WWII, passenger service rapidly declined to make it unprofitable to run a full passenger train every day. The ET&WNC used car 15, which was a passenger car equipped with both a post office and baggage compartment. Behind car 15 was either one or two of the railroad's three piggyback flat cars. The ET&WNC's passenger station was next to the trucking depot, while the railyard was another mile down the line. In order to save time, crews picked up car 15 before picking up the piggyback flat cars.

The ET&WNC hauled iron ore from the Cranberry mines, pig iron from the local forge, and lumber from the forests of western North Carolina. CIC purchased the Linville River Railway (LRR, known as the "Arbuckle" line) in 1913, a line originally constructed in the 1890s to haul lumber between Cranberry and Saginaw, North Carolina. The Linville River Railway was then subsequently extended to Boone, North Carolina, but later suffered heavy track damage from a 1940 flood. The line was eventually abandoned following Interstate Commerce Commission approval on March 22, 1941. Subsequently, much of North Carolina Highway 105 was built along the former route of the LRR.
 
The ET&WNC was one of the major rail lines to haul both passengers and freight in the region during World War II, though business declined dramatically after the War. The  narrow gauge track from Elizabethton was soon abandoned, though the ET&WNC retained service between Johnson City and the rayon plants of Elizabethton. The tracks in and around Johnson City (where most of the company's industrial customers were located) were dual gauge to allow for interchange with other railroads. The ET&WNC purchased three standard gauge locomotives: #204 (former AT&N ), #205 (former RF&P ), and #206 (former Illinois Central ). These locomotives were used to switch cars throughout the Johnson City area. The ET&WNC Railroad Company's narrow gauge lines officially ceased operations on October 16, 1950, with scrapping commencing the following year.

In 1952, the last of the narrow gauge engines (#9, #11, and #12) were put up for sale. #9 and #11 were offered to be put on display in Elizabethton and Johnson City, but this offer was turned down. The #9 and #11 were scrapped but the #12 was purchased by a group of railroad enthusiasts and shipped to Virginia. Movie cowboy Gene Autry later bought the unit, intending to transport it to California for use in his films. After a lengthy restoration, the locomotive returned to North Carolina on May 23, 1957, along with a few pieces of the original rolling stock. That summer, the "Tweetsie Railroad" became the state's newest travel attraction and family theme park. The train travels over a scenic 3-mile (4.8 kilometers) loop through the mountains near Blowing Rock, close to the original end-of-the-line station in Boone. The park operates two steam locomotives: in addition to former ET&WNC No. 12, in 1960, the company acquired No. 190 (the Yukon Queen, a type 2-8-2 locomotive) from the State of Alaska and restored it for operation. Tweetsie is also home to an authentic wooden coach, former East Broad Top Railroad #5, which is run on special occasions such as their annual Railroad Heritage Weekend event.

The ET&WNC continued operations of the standard gauge lines well after the narrow gauge closures. In 1952, the railroad sent a representative to the Southern Railway roundhouse in Asheville, North Carolina, to look for some new motive power. The representative was first offered Ks-1 2-8-0s #685 and #835, but he instead chooses engines #630 and #722 because they were in better condition. The 630 and 722 were renumbered to 207 and 208, respectively. They served the ET&WNC until December 8, 1967, when the Southern Railway traded two ALCo Rs-3s for the two Ks-1 locomotives to run in their new steam program along with Savannah & Atlanta #750 and Southern Railway 4501. The 630 is now at the Tennessee Valley Railroad Museum in Chattanooga, Tennessee, and the 722 is now at the Great Smoky Mountains Railroad in Bryson City, North Carolina.

The Green Bay Packaging Company of Green Bay, Wisconsin, ultimately acquired the railroad properties and reorganized the company as the East Tennessee Railway (ETRY). Since 1996, the railroad has been owned by Genesee and Wyoming, an international operator of short line railroads, as part of its Rail Link group. The standard gauge line continued to operate switching operations in Johnson City for freight arriving via CSX and Norfolk Southern, until October 10, 2003. In 2012 removal of the remaining ten-mile section of the ET&WNC between Johnson City and Elizabethton began, as part of a Rails to Trail conversion project. The first seven miles were completed in August 2014, with the remaining three miles completed in August 2015.  In 2016, Carter County began efforts to "extend" this trail to Roan Mountain by marking existing roads. For the most part, this extension does not follow the original ET&WNC right of way but does include a few more miles of the original roadbed along Old Railroad Grade Road. As a result, the East Tennessee Railway now operates very little trackage to serve the remaining industries around the Johnson City yard.

Locomotives

See also

East Tennessee Railway
Laurel Fork Railway
Tweetsie Railroad
Southern Railway 630
Southern Railway 722

Historic designations
 National Register of Historic Places #NPS–92000147 — East Tennessee & Western North Carolina Railroad Locomotive No. 12

References

 East Tennessee & Western North Carolina Railroad (ET&WNC)  — accessed on November 26, 2005.
 East Tennessee and Western North Carolina Transportation Company Records, 1868–1970  — accessed on November 14, 2005.
 History of Western North Carolina  article by John Preston Arthur (1914) —  accessed on November 14, 2005.

Further reading

External links
 ET&WNC Railroad Historical Society official website
 ET&WNC Area Photos A Modern Day Photo Album
 Slim Rails: East Tennessee and Western North Carolina Railroad
 "Tweetsie Comes Home" article in the October 1957 issue of Ties, the Southern Railway System magazine.
 Tweetsie Railroad History
 Cy Crumley ET&WNC Photo Collection (johnsonsdepot.com)
East Tennessee and Western North Carolina Transportation Company Records

Defunct North Carolina railroads
Defunct Tennessee railroads
Transportation in Appalachia
East Tennessee
Western North Carolina
Narrow gauge railroads in North Carolina
Narrow gauge railroads in Tennessee
3 ft gauge railways in the United States
Transportation in Avery County, North Carolina
Transportation in Carter County, Tennessee
Transportation in Watauga County, North Carolina
Elizabethton, Tennessee
Hampton, Tennessee
Johnson City, Tennessee
National Register of Historic Places in Watauga County, North Carolina
Railway companies established in 1881
Railway companies disestablished in 1950
1881 establishments in North Carolina
1881 establishments in Tennessee
1950 disestablishments in North Carolina
1950 disestablishments in Tennessee
Railway locomotives on the National Register of Historic Places
Rail infrastructure on the National Register of Historic Places in North Carolina